Omole is a Nigerian surname. Notable people with the surname include:

 Augustine Omole (1955–2021), Nigerian bishop
 Idowu Bamitale Omole (born 1954), Nigerian educator
 Lawrence Omole (1915–2008), Nigerian entrepreneur
 Olugbenga Omole (born 1972), Nigerian politician, legislator, football administrator, and farmer

See also
 Leucotmemis omole a moth of the subfamily Arctiinae